The 2006–07 Iranian Futsal 1st Division was divided into two phases.

The league was composed of 16 teams divided into two divisions of 8 teams each, whose teams were divided geographically. Teams play other teams in their own division, once at home and once away for a total of 14 matches, each.

Teams

Group A

Group B

Play Off 

 Felamingo Promoted to the Super League.

First leg

Return leg

 Zoghalsang Promoted to the Super League.

First leg

Return leg

See also 
 2006–07 Persian Gulf Cup
 2007 Iran Futsal's 2nd Division
 2006–07 Azadegan League
 2006–07 Iran Football's 2nd Division
 2006–07 Iran Football's 3rd Division
 2006–07 Hazfi Cup
 Iranian Super Cup

References

External links 
   فوتسال نیوز 
  I.R. Iran Football Federation

Iran Futsal's 1st Division seasons
2006–07 in Iranian futsal leagues